Duplicaria tristis is a species of sea snail, a marine gastropod mollusk in the family Terebridae, the auger snails.

References

 Hutton, F. W. (1873). Catalogue of the marine Mollusca of New Zealand with diagnoses of the species. Didsbury, Wellington. xx + 116 pp
 Powell, A.W.B. (1940) The marine Mollusca of the Aupourian Province, New Zealand. Transactions of the Royal Society of New Zealand, 70, 205–248.
 Ponder, W. F. 1968. Nomenclatural notes on some New Zealand rachiglossan gastropods with descriptions of five new species. Records of the Dominion Museum, 6(4):29-47
 Pritchard, G.B. & Gatliff, J.H. (1902) On some new species of Victoria Mollusca, no. 5. Proceedings of the Royal Society of Victoria, new series, 14, 180–184, pls. 9–10
 Bratcher T. & Cernohorsky W.O. (1987). Living terebras of the world. A monograph of the recent Terebridae of the world. American Malacologists, Melbourne, Florida & Burlington, Massachusetts. 240pp.

External links
 Fedosov, A. E.; Malcolm, G.; Terryn, Y.; Gorson, J.; Modica, M. V.; Holford, M.; Puillandre, N. (2020). Phylogenetic classification of the family Terebridae (Neogastropoda: Conoidea). Journal of Molluscan Studies
 Deshayes G.P. (1859). A general review of the genus Terebra, and a description of new species. Proceedings of the Zoological Society of London. 27: 270-321
 Smith E.A. (1873). Remarks on a few species belonging to the family Terebridae, and descriptions of several new forms in the collection of the British Museum. Annals and Magazine of Natural History. ser. 4, 11: 262-271
 Suter H. (1909). Description of new species and subspecies of New Zealand Mollusca, with notes on a few species. Proceedings of the Malacological Society of London. 8: 253-265.
 Hutton, F. W. (1885). Descriptions of new Tertiary shells. Part 1. Transactions of the New Zealand Institute 17: 313-324
 Spencer H.G., Willan R.C., Marshall B.A. & Murray T.J. (2011). Checklist of the Recent Mollusca Recorded from the New Zealand Exclusive Economic Zone

Terebridae
Gastropods described in 1859